Blue's Clues & You! is a live-action/computer-animated interactive educational children's television series developed by Traci Paige Johnson and Angela C. Santomero for Nickelodeon. It is a revival of the 1996–2006 Blue's Clues television series with a new host, Josh Dela Cruz, and is produced by Nickelodeon Animation Studio, 9 Story Media Group, and Brown Bag Films. It premiered on Nickelodeon on November 11, 2019.

Premise 
Similar to the original 1996 series, this series has a live-action host in an animated world. The series features new production designs and the characters (aside from the host) are animated digitally, though the visual style remains similar to the style used in the original series.

Like the original show, Blue's Clues & You! depends upon built-in silences designed to encourage audience participation and what The New York Times called "direct address inviting preschoolers to play along with games and solve mini-mysteries". The show's producers recognized that its return was due to nostalgia, and that although young children had more access to technology and were more visual than preschoolers before, they still had the same developmental and emotional needs to "slow down".

Cast and characters

Main 
 Blue (voiced by Traci Paige Johnson) – A blue puppy who leaves pawprints on objects (and occasionally characters) as clues to what she wants to do.
 Josh (played by Josh Dela Cruz) – The host of the new series. He is a cousin of Steve and Joe from the original series.
 Mailbox (voiced by Doug Murray) – A mailbox who delivers a letter or e-mail to Josh every day.
 Sidetable Drawer (voiced by Liyou Abere in season one and Shazdeh Kapadia in season two) – The keeper of the Handy Dandy Notebook, who lives in the living room.
 Mr. Salt and Mrs. Pepper (voiced by Brad Adamson and Gisele Rousseau) – A married couple of condiment dispensers who live in the kitchen.
 Paprika (voiced by Shechinah Mpumlwana in season one and Abigail Nicholson in season two) – Mr. Salt and Mrs. Pepper's eldest child. She carries a smartphone made from a graham cracker.
 Cinnamon (voiced by Jaiden Cannatelli in season one and Niko Ceci in season two) – A cinnamon shaker who is Paprika's younger brother. He wears a baseball cap.
 Sage and Ginger – Mr. Salt and Mrs. Pepper's newborn twins. Paprika and Cinnamon are learning how to take care of them.
 Shovel and Pail (voiced by Leo Orgil and Jordana Blake) – A brother and sister who live in the backyard.
 Tickety Tock (voiced by Ava Augustin) – An alarm clock who wakes the residents of the Blue's Clues House each morning.
 Slippery Soap (voiced by Jacob Soley) – A bar of soap who lives in the bathroom sink. He slides around everywhere he goes.

Recurring 
 Magenta (voiced by Diane Salema) – A magenta puppy who is Blue's best friend from school.
 Periwinkle (voiced by Luxton Handspiker) – A kitten who made his debut in the third season.
 Rainbow Puppy (voiced by Brianna Bryan) – A rainbow-colored puppy who is Periwinkle's friend from the city.
 Steve (played by Steve Burns) – Josh's cousin and Joe's older brother, a college graduate who works at the Blue Prints Detective Agency (a nod to the title of the pilot for the original series). He was the first host of the original series.
 Joe (played by Donovan Patton) – Josh's other cousin and Steve's younger brother, who works at the Present Store. He was the second host of the original series.
 Lola (played by Carolyn Fe) – Josh's grandmother, originally from the Philippines (lola translates to "grandmother" in Filipino).

Production  
In 2017, the original show's creators, Angela C. Santomero and Traci Paige Johnson, after many years of trying to bring Blue's Clues back to Nickelodeon, were given permission to develop a reboot for 20 episodes.

On April 17, 2018, Nickelodeon posted a video discussing the audition process for the series. Over a thousand people participated in the auditions.

On September 13, 2018, Nickelodeon announced that Josh Dela Cruz, best known as an understudy for Disney's Aladdin on Broadway for five years, would be the series' host. Dela Cruz, who grew up in New Jersey, watched the original show with his younger sister and is the first Asian-American to host Blue's Clues. Traci Paige Johnson, who co-created the original series and voiced Blue, reprises the role in this series. Steve Burns, the first host of the original series, participated in the casting process.

9 Story Media Group's live-action and animation division co-produces the series with animators from Brown Bag Films. The animators updated the show with objects familiar to preschoolers of the modern age; for example, the handy dandy notebook doubles as a smartphone and emails arrive during mail time. The series is being filmed in  9 Story's Toronto studio.

On May 27, 2019, a first-look trailer was released to the public. On August 2, an extended version of the theme song was released. 

On August 26, 2019, it was announced that the series would premiere on November 11, and that the show's two original hosts, Burns and Donovan Patton, would be returning to portray their respective characters in the series premiere episode. The New York Times reported that Burns was at first reluctant to continue his association with the show, but was persuaded by its fans on social media to write, direct, and appear on the show.

On November 19, 2019, the series was renewed for a second season of 20 episodes. The series was later renewed for a third season of 20 episodes on February 19, 2020, a fourth season of 26 episodes on February 18, 2021, and a fifth season of 26 episodes on March 24, 2022.

Episodes

Series overview

Season 1 (2019–20)

Season 2 (2020–21)

Season 3 (2021–22)

Season 4 (2022–23)

Notes

Release 
The series premiered on Nickelodeon on November 11, 2019. Three episodes were made available to stream for free on Vudu on September 27, ahead of the official release on Nickelodeon. In Canada, the series premiered on Treehouse TV on the same day as the U.S. date.

Awards and nominations

Other media

Film 

On July 12, 2021, it was revealed that an animated movie for the series would be made, marking the 25th anniversary of the franchise. In the film, Josh and Blue attempt to audition for a Broadway musical. Directed by Matt Stawski and written by Angela Santomero and Liz Maccie, the film began production in summer 2021. On February 15, 2022, the title was revealed as Blue's Big City Adventure. The film was released on Paramount+ on November 18, 2022.

Merchandising 
In July 2019, Viacom Nickelodeon Consumer Products announced that Just Play, a Florida toy company, would produce plush, figurines, playsets, and roleplay merchandise based on the series, while VTech, a Hong Kong company, would produce "early learning toys with modern tech features". Cardinal, a New York-based company, will manage games and puzzles. The products became available for purchase in fall 2020.

Tour 
On March 8, 2022, a touring production titled Blue’s Clues & You! Live On Stage was announced. The tour, which began on September 24, 2022, is set to travel across the United States.

References

External links 
 
 

2010s American animated television series
2020s American animated television series
2010s American children's television series
2020s American children's television series
2019 American television series debuts
2010s Canadian animated television series
2020s Canadian animated television series
2010s Canadian children's television series
2020s Canadian children's television series
2019 Canadian television series debuts
2010s Nickelodeon original programming
2020s Nickelodeon original programming
American children's animated adventure television series
American children's animated fantasy television series
American computer-animated television series
American preschool education television series
American television series with live action and animation
Canadian children's animated adventure television series
Canadian children's animated fantasy television series
Canadian computer-animated television series
Canadian preschool education television series
Canadian television series with live action and animation
Animated television series reboots
Animated preschool education television series
2010s preschool education television series
2020s preschool education television series
Nickelodeon original programming
Nick Jr. original programming
Animated television series about dogs
English-language television shows
Television series by 9 Story Media Group
Television series by Brown Bag Films
Television series created by Angela Santomero